Elijah St Quentin Pyle (22 September 1918 – 31 August 2009) was an English professional footballer who played as an inside forward in the Football League for York City, and in non-League football for West Stanley.

Born in Chester-le-Street, County Durham, Pyle started his career at West Stanley, before moving to York City in 1947, where he made 10 League appearances and scored three goals. He thereafter returned to West Stanley.

He died in Grange Villa, County Durham in 2009, aged 90.

References

1918 births
2009 deaths
Sportspeople from Chester-le-Street
Footballers from County Durham
English footballers
Association football forwards
West Stanley F.C. players
York City F.C. players
English Football League players